El Defensor del Obrero ('The Defender of the Worker') was a newspaper published in Montevideo, Uruguay. The newspaper carried the byline "The first scientific socialist periodical in Montevideo". El Defensor del Obrero was published between August 25, 1895 and February 2, 1896. The editors of the newspaper included José Capalán (president of the Marble Workers Union) and Muvo Luzzoni.

References

1895 establishments in Uruguay
1896 disestablishments in Uruguay
Defunct newspapers published in Uruguay
Mass media in Montevideo
Publications established in 1895
Publications disestablished in 1896
Socialism in Uruguay
Socialist newspapers
Spanish-language newspapers